Videna oleacina  is a species of terrestrial pulmonate gastropod mollusk in the family Trochomorphidae.

This species is endemic to Palau.

References
1. Rundell, R. J. Diversity and conservation of the land snail fauna of the western Pacific islands of Belau (Republic of Palau , Oceania). Am. Malacol. Bull. 90, 81–90 (2010).

Fauna of Palau
Videna
Endemic fauna of Palau
Taxonomy articles created by Polbot